Ruel Adrian Fox (born 14 January 1968) is a former professional footballer and the club chairman of Whitton United.

As a player he was midfielder who played in the Premier League for Norwich City, Newcastle United and Tottenham Hotspur. He also played in the Football League for West Bromwich Albion. He was capped twice at England B level, but later despite it being two years since retiring he awarded himself two caps for Montserrat whilst serving as head coach.

Following retirement, Fox had a spell as manager of non-league Whitton United, where he has also acted as assistant manager and currently remains as the chairman. He has also worked as a personal trainer and has worked for Suffolk College.

Club career

Norwich City
Fox made his senior debut for Norwich City during the 1986–87 season in a Full Members Cup match against Coventry City and made his league debut against Oxford United at Carrow Road a few days later.

After several seasons of being a substitute and finding it difficult to hold down a regular first team spot, he eventually established himself and played an important part in the 1992–93 and 1993–94 campaigns, which were two of the best in the club's history. In 1992–93, they led the inaugural FA Premier League several times before finished a club best third, and in 1993–94 they reached the last 16 of the UEFA Cup, defeating Bayern Munich on the way.

He was a fast, tricky winger who was a handful for defenders and provided good crosses. In 2002, Norwich supporters voted Fox an inaugural member of the Norwich City F.C. Hall of Fame.

Newcastle United
Fox left Norwich on 2 February 1994 to join Newcastle United for a fee of £2,250,000. Upon signing him, Newcastle manager Kevin Keegan described him as "the best player in his position in the country".

Fox was an early member of the Newcastle teams known as "the Entertainers". He played in Newcastle's final 14 games of the 1993–94 season and scored twice as they finished third in the Premier League and qualified for the UEFA Cup – the first time since the 1970s that the Magpies had competed in Europe. He scored 10 league goals in the 1994–95 season, as the Magpies finished sixth and just missed out on another European campaign having led the league for the first quarter of the season, but the arrival of David Ginola in June 1995 left Fox facing a fight for regular first team action. He did, however, play five times for the Magpies the following season.

Tottenham Hotspur
Fox signed for Tottenham Hotspur on 6 October 1995 in a deal worth £4.25 million. His fee made him Tottenham's second most costly player at the time, behind Chris Armstrong whose £4.5 million deal had been concluded just a few months earlier. Despite not being part of Tottenham's squad for the 1999 Football League Cup Final he made three appearances during their victorious League Cup campaign.

West Bromwich Albion
Fox found it difficult to settle at White Hart Lane and he was constantly linked with moves away from Tottenham Hotspur before joining West Bromwich Albion at the start of the 2000–01 season. He helped them to promotion in 2001–02, before being released at the end of the season. He subsequently retired from playing professionally.

Coaching career
Fox was named head coach of Montserrat in October 2004, and despite being two years since he retired from playing he gave himself two international cap and scoring one for his adopted nation in a 5–4 defeat against Antigua on 2 November 2004.

Upon his return he was named as coach of non-league Whitton United and remained in that role until 2008, where he was replaced by his assistant Ronnie Mauge. He has also acted as assistant manager and now is the club's chairman. He also became a coach at Suffolk College.

Personal life
In November 2008, Fox returned to hometown Ipswich and ran his own a restaurant and bar.

In 2012, Fox was working as a personal trainer in Ipswich.

References

External links

Career information at ex-canaries.co.uk

1968 births
Living people
Sportspeople from Ipswich
Montserratian footballers
English footballers
Association football midfielders
Montserrat international footballers
England B international footballers
Newcastle United F.C. players
Norwich City F.C. players
Tottenham Hotspur F.C. players
West Bromwich Albion F.C. players
English Football League players
Premier League players
English sportspeople of Antigua and Barbuda descent
English people of Montserratian descent
English football managers
Montserratian football managers
British sportspeople of Antigua and Barbuda descent
Montserrat national football team managers
Black British sportspeople